Ghassoul (Arabic: غسول) is a municipality in El Bayadh Province, Algeria. It part of Brézina District and has a population of 5.179, which gives it seven seats in the PMA. Its postal code is 32150 and its municipal code is 3205.

It is also the name of a red Moroccan clay (sometimes known as Rhassoul) dug in the Atlas mountains.

Communes of El Bayadh Province
El Bayadh Province